Mastery Charter School Mann Elementary, formerly the William B. Mann School, is a historic school located in the Wynnefield neighborhood of Philadelphia, Pennsylvania. It is a charter school run by Mastery Charter Schools.

The building was designed by Irwin T. Catharine and built in 1923–1924. It is a three-story, nine bay by five bay, brick building on a raised basement in the Colonial Revival-style. It features large stone arch surrounds on the first level, a projecting entrance pavilion, a double stone cornice, and brick parapet topped by stone coping. The building was added to the National Register of Historic Places in 1988.

It was named for Philadelphia lawyer William B. Mann (1816-1896).

References

External links

School buildings on the National Register of Historic Places in Philadelphia
Colonial Revival architecture in Pennsylvania
School buildings completed in 1924
Charter schools in Pennsylvania
West Philadelphia
1924 establishments in Pennsylvania